The R319 is a Regional Route in South Africa that connects L'Agulhas and Struisbaai in the south with the N2 near Swellendam via Bredasdorp.

From L'Agulhas, it follows the coast east to nearby Struisbaai. The roads then heads north and inland, bypassing Hotagterklip to the east. Near Bredasdorp it receives the R317. The routes enter the town together where they meet the R316. The R319 is the first to diverge on the otherside of Bredasdorp and heads north-north-east to its terminus at the N2.

References

External links
 Routes Travel Info

Regional Routes in the Western Cape